Hit and Run – Revisited is the twelfth studio album by the British heavy metal band Girlschool, released in 2011. The album is a re-recording of the 1981 album Hit and Run, considered by most critics a classic of the new wave of British heavy metal period and the most commercially successful for Girlschool. The new album celebrates the 30th anniversary of the release of Hit and Run and includes as bonus track a re-recording of "Demolition Boys" and a duet with the German metal singer Doro on a new version of the title track.

The album cover features art by the English commercial artist, Adrian Chesterman who was also responsible for creating cover art for, amongst others, Motörhead's 1979 Bomber album.

Track listing

Personnel

Band members
Kim McAuliffe – lead and backing vocals, rhythm guitar
Jackie Chambers – lead guitar, backing vocals
Enid Williams – lead and backing vocals, bass
Denise Dufort – drums

Additional musicians
Doro Pesch – lead vocals on track 13

Production
Tim Hamill - producer, engineer, mixing

References

2011 remix albums
Girlschool albums